Francis Letellier (born 19 December 1964) is a French journalist who works on France 3.

Early life 
Letellier was born in Vire in Calvados. Letellier spent his childhood in Pont-Farcy, where his parents were farmers.

Personal life 
Letellier is gay and married.

Honours 

 Ordre des Arts et des Lettres

References 

1964 births
Living people
French television journalists
21st-century French journalists
People from Vire
University of Caen Normandy alumni
French gay men
Commandeurs of the Ordre des Arts et des Lettres
French LGBT journalists
Gay journalists